T-complex protein 1 subunit theta is a protein that in humans is encoded by the CCT8 gene. The CCT8 protein is a component of the TRiC complex.

See also 
 TCP1, T-complex protein 1 subunit alpha
 Chaperonin

References

External links

Further reading